Social Renewal Party can refer to:
Social Renewal Party (Angola)
Social Renewal Party (Guinea-Bissau)
Social Renewal Party (São Tomé and Príncipe)

Political party disambiguation pages